Robert Andrew Carlson (born 1974/75) is an American politician and member of the Minnesota House of Representatives. A member of the Minnesota Democratic–Farmer–Labor Party (DFL), he represents District 50B in the southern Twin Cities metropolitan area.

Early life and career
Carlson attended the Iowa State University, graduating with a Bachelor of Science in community and regional planning, and the University of St. Thomas, graduating with a Master of Business Administration. He was a policy fellow at the University of Minnesota Humphrey School of Public Affairs.

Carlson is a project manager for the Minneapolis Public Works Department. He served on the Bloomington Housing and Redevelopment Authority and the Bloomington City Council from 2014 to 2016.

Minnesota House of Representatives
Carlson was first elected to the Minnesota House of Representatives in 2016, defeating Republican incumbent Chad Anderson. He once again defeated Chad Anderson and won re-election in 2018.

Personal life
Carlson and his wife, Kari, have two daughters. He has lived in Bloomington, Minnesota since 2006.

References

External links

 Official House of Representatives website
 Official campaign website

1970s births
Living people
People from Bloomington, Minnesota
Democratic Party members of the Minnesota House of Representatives
21st-century American politicians